Nephele rosae is a moth in the family Sphingidae. It is endemic to Africa.

Subspecies
Nephele rosae rosae (forest and woodland from Sierra Leone to Angola and Uganda)
Nephele rosae illustris Jordan, 1920 (South Africa and Mozambique to Zimbabwe, Zambia, Malawi, Tanzania and the coast of Kenya)

References

Nephele (moth)
Moths described in 1875
Moths of Africa